Tarvinder Singh Marwah (born 1 May 1959) is an Indian politician from Delhi. He thrice served as member of Delhi Legislative Assembly in Second, Third and Fourth Delhi Assembly. He represented Jangpura constituency. He switched from Congress to BJP on 6 July 2022.

He has also served as the Parliamentary Secretary to the Chief Minister of Delhi.

Position held

References

Living people
20th-century Indian politicians
Indian National Congress politicians from Delhi
1959 births